Aboubacar Demba Camara (born 7 November 1994) is a Guinean professional footballer who plays as a striker for Mouloudia Oujda.

Career
Camara made his Ligue 1 debut at AC Ajaccio on 21 September 2013 against Stade Rennais in a 2–0 away defeat. He replaced Johan Cavalli as a substitute after 69 minutes. After the end of the 2013–14 season, he moved to Turkey for Gaziantepspor in the summer of 2014, penning a four-year contract.<ref>{{cite web |url=http://www.gaziantepspor.org.tr/tr/haber-detay.asp?Sayfa=Aboubacar%20Demba%20Camara%20Gaziantepspor'da&Id=4724 |archive-url=https://web.archive.org/web/20140703204853/http://www.gaziantepspor.org.tr/tr/haber-detay.asp?Sayfa=Aboubacar%20Demba%20Camara%20Gaziantepspor%27da&Id=4724 |url-status=dead |archive-date=3 July 2014 |title=Aboubacar Demba Camara Gaziantepsporda |trans-title=Aboubacar Demba Camara in Gaziantepspor |publisher=Gaziantepspor Kulübü |language=Turkish |accessdate=6 July 2014 }}</ref>

On 31 January 2019, the last day of the 2018–19 winter transfer window, Camara joined Red Star F.C. on loan from Troyes AC. Prior to the loan agreement, his Troyes contract was extended until 2021.

In the summer of 2019, he moved to Hapoel Tel Aviv, and in 2020, moved to Petaling Jaya City FC in Malaysia. He is now a free agent with his only team the Guinea national team.

Career statistics

International goalsScores and results list Guinea's goal tally first.''

References

External links
 

1994 births
Living people
Association football forwards
Guinean footballers
Guinean expatriate footballers
AC Ajaccio players
Gaziantepspor footballers
Paris FC players
Anorthosis Famagusta F.C. players
ES Troyes AC players
Red Star F.C. players
Hapoel Tel Aviv F.C. players
Petaling Jaya City FC players
MC Oujda players
Ligue 1 players
Ligue 2 players
Süper Lig players
Israeli Premier League players
Malaysia Super League players
Botola players
Expatriate footballers in France
Expatriate footballers in Turkey
Expatriate footballers in Cyprus
Expatriate footballers in Israel
Expatriate footballers in Malaysia
Expatriate footballers in Morocco
Guinean expatriate sportspeople in Cyprus
Guinean expatriate sportspeople in France
Guinean expatriate sportspeople in Turkey
Guinean expatriate sportspeople in Israel
Guinean expatriate sportspeople in Malaysia
Guinean expatriate sportspeople in Morocco
Guinea international footballers